Apamea spaldingi, or Spalding's Quaker, is a moth of the family Noctuidae. The species was first described by John Bernhardt Smith in 1909. It is native to interior western North America.

It is mottled and streaked grey with lighter hindwings and is somewhat variable. The flight season is early for Apamea species, beginning in April in some areas.

References

Apamea (moth)
Moths of North America
Moths described in 1909